Senator Hewes may refer to:

Billy Hewes (born 1961), Mississippi State Senate
Richard Hewes (1926–2014), Maine State Senate